Tavern Township is an inactive township in Pulaski County, in the U.S. state of Missouri.

Tavern Township takes its name from Tavern Creek.

References

Townships in Missouri
Townships in Pulaski County, Missouri